Matthew David Crawford (born August 20, 1980 in Durham, North Carolina) is an American soccer midfielder who last played for the Colorado Rapids of Major League Soccer.

He played high school soccer at Durham Academy in Durham, North Carolina and helped earn them state titles in 1995 and 1996.

Crawford played college soccer at the University of North Carolina from 1999 to 2002.  He finished his career at UNC with 12 goals and 35 assists in 89 games, 81 of them starts.

Upon graduating, Crawford was drafted 38th overall in the 2003 MLS SuperDraft by the Rapids.  Crawford surprised by earning a place on the team, and played extensively as a reserve defender, appearing in 16 games, 8 of them starts, and adding one assist.  In 2004, Crawford cemented a starting role in the Rapids midfield, although he still played occasionally in defense.  He played in all 30 Rapids games that year, starting 28, and adding one goal and four assists.

References

1980 births
Living people
American soccer players
North Carolina Tar Heels men's soccer players
Colorado Rapids players
Major League Soccer players
Colorado Rapids draft picks
Association football midfielders